Thomas Spira (1923–2005) was Professor of History at the University of Prince Edward Island and editor of the Canadian Review of Studies in Nationalism, the first academic journal devoted to the study of nationalism. Born in Bratislava, Czechoslovakia, Spira moved to the United States just before the outbreak of World War II. He enrolled in the Bachelor of Arts program at the City College of New York in 1964, and later completed his M.A. and Ph.D. in History at McGill University in Montreal. Spira began teaching at the University of Prince Edward Island in 1980, and was named Professor Emeritus by its Board of Governors in 1998.

Selected publications

References

Historians of Canada
Historians of Germany
Historians of Hungary
Historians of Europe
1923 births
2005 deaths
Canadian male non-fiction writers
20th-century Canadian historians